Bradley Gotch (born 23 June 1962) is a former Australian rules footballer who played for Fitzroy and St Kilda in the Victorian/Australian Football League (VFL/AFL). He is currently the head coach of West Adelaide Football Club in the SANFL.

Gotch was one of smallest players of his era at 165 cm and possessed an accurate left foot pass. Debuting in 1982 for Fitzroy, Gotch played thirty games in his first three years. In 1985 he played three games in the first six rounds before being delisted by Fitzroy and finishing the season with Port Adelaide in the South Australian National Football League (SANFL). After impressing at Port Adelaide, he returned to Melbourne to play for the St Kilda Football Club. His best goal kicking feat was for St Kilda against his old side Fitzroy where he kicked seven goals in a game in 1987. He finished his career playing for Dandenong Football Club in the Victorian Football Association (VFA).

Coaching career
Gotch coached Williamstown in the Victorian Football League (VFL) from 2002 to 2009, becoming the second-longest serving coach in the club's history, coaching the club to finals in six of the eight years including the 2003 VFL premiership. He also worked in development coaching roles with both Collingwood and the Western Bulldogs alignments during those years. In 2010 Gotch was appointed senior coach of the Casey Scorpions, taking over from Peter German. He joined Port Adelaide as an assistant coach on 19 October 2011. In 2014, Gotch signed a two-year contract to coach South Adelaide in the SANFL.

Gotch's sons also play high level sport. Xavier Gotch plays for South Adelaide under Gotch, and Seb Gotch plays cricket for the Melbourne Stars.

References

External links

1962 births
Living people
Fitzroy Football Club players
St Kilda Football Club players
Williamstown Football Club coaches
Casey Demons coaches
Australian rules footballers from Victoria (Australia)
Port Adelaide Football Club (SANFL) players
Port Adelaide Football Club players (all competitions)
South Adelaide Football Club coaches
Dandenong Football Club players
Dandenong Football Club coaches